The Geely Binrui is a compact sedan produced by Chinese car manufacturer Geely. The vehicle went on sale on 30 August 2018. The vehicle is based on the Geely BMA platform, as the first vehicle based on the platform.

Overview
In May 2018, Geely released a "A06" model and named it Geely SL. It sets its position as a sport sedan based on Geely Emgrand GL. The new car should be able to face the need of young people. The exterior appearance of fastback body style and the headlight takes ideas from Geely Borui GE.

The new car carries the Geely's G-Power 1.4-litre turbocharged engine mated to 6-speed manual or CVT transmission and 1.0-litre turbocharged engine mated to 6-speed dual-clutch transmission. Binrui provides self-driving on level 2, which equipped autonomous cruise control. It's also possible to free hands from the steering wheel with the lane support system. Since this is only a assisted system, the system would warn the driver after a few minutes or the lane support system could not find the lane markings. The self-driving system is not able to overtake and switch lane.

Engines

Geely Binrui F-Type Sport

A sportier variant of the Binrui dubbed the Binrui F-Type Sport was unveiled in December 2020. The F-Type Sport variant features a black finish honeycomb grille, lower front bumper intake and trim, rear spoiler and diffuser trim, window trim and side mirror covers, along with a set of smoked, double-five-spoke alloys. In terms of power, the F-Type Sport variant is powered by a revised version of the 1.4-litre turbo petrol engine.

Geely Binrui Cool
The Geely Binrui Cool unveiled in March 2022 is the even more upmarket and more performance oriented variant compared to the F-Type Sport variant. The front and rear end were restyled to be more aggressive with Geely's "Racing Storm" design theme and the wheels are now equipped with 17-inch blacked-out rims and bright-colored brake calipers. Performance wise, the Binrui Cool features a 1.5 litre turbocharged four-cylinder petrol engine that develops  matched with a 7-speed dual-clutch gearbox.

The interior of the Binrui Cool features a 10.25-inch full LCD instrument cluster and a 12.3-inch central control screen are on the instrument panel. The gear lever of the Binrui Cool has also been upgraded to a racing, electronic gear lever.

Sales

References

External links

Official website

Sedans
Front-wheel-drive vehicles
Binrui
Cars introduced in 2018
Cars of China